Jay Barnet Beckenstein (born May 14, 1951) is an American saxophonist, composer, producer, and the co-founder of the band Spyro Gyra. He owned BearTracks Studios in Suffern, New York.

Music career
Beckenstein was born in Long Island, New York, to a Jewish family.  His mother, Lorraine, was an opera singer and his father, Leonard, loved jazz and introduced him to Charlie Parker and Lester Young when he was a baby. He started playing the piano at age five when he moved to Farmingdale, New York. He was given his first saxophone at the age of seven. In his senior year of high school, he and his family moved to Germany. He attended and graduated from Nurnberg American High School in 1969. He has said that being Jewish in Germany was positive at the time. However, he has recalled that he once saw an old photo of an elderly neighbor in his SS Nazi uniform while visiting him and he never went back. He received a college degree in music from the University at Buffalo in 1973. Trumpeter Dizzy Gillespie once played with the college band while Beckenstein was a band member.

They soon recruited 16-year-old keyboardist Tom Schuman and recorded their debut album. However, due to lack of funds, the record was going to be their last album until they gave it away and sold 100,000 copies. From there, they got a deal and released their next album in 1979.

In 2000, Beckenstein released his first solo album, Eye Contact, which charted No. 23 on the Top Contemporary Jazz Albums.

Beckenstein played the saxophone solo on American progressive metal band Dream Theater's "Another Day", from the album Images and Words, and single version of song "Through her Eyes", from the album Metropolis Pt. 2: Scenes from a Memory. He also played a solo part in "Take Away My Pain" on the live album Once in a Livetime as well as "Another Day" during the performance of Metropolis 2000: Scenes from New York.

Beckenstein is divorced and has three children.

Discography

Solo
2000: Eye Contact (Windham Hill)

With Bob James
 1981 All Around the Town
 1981 Sign of the Times
 1982 Hands Down

With Dream Theater
 1992 Images and Words
 1993 Live at the Marquee
 1998 Once in a LIVEtime
 2000 Through Her Eyes
 2001 Live Scenes from New York

With Jason Miles
 1996 Mr. X  
 2000 A Love Affair: The Music of Ivan Lins 
 2000 Celebrating the Music of Weather Report  
 2002 Brazilian Nights 
 2002 To Grover, With Love  
 2006 What's Going On?

With others
 1980 Orleans, Orleans
 1989 Away from Home, David Broza
 1990 Extremities, Tom Schuman
 1991 Natural Selection, Dave Samuels
 1995 Basia on Broadway, Basia
 1995 David Broza, David Broza
 1997 Deep in the Night, Rick Rhodes
 1999 Listen, Chuck Loeb
 1999 Somewhere in the Night, Mercedes Hall
 2001 Butterfly, Special EFX
 2002 Urban Life, The V.I.P. Club
 2003 In the Name of Love, Freddy Cole
 2012 The Fusion Syndicate, The Fusion Syndicate

References

External links
 Official website (archived)
 Spyro Gyra official website
 Huffington Post interview (2013)
 

People from Long Island
Living people
1951 births
American jazz soprano saxophonists
American jazz tenor saxophonists
American male saxophonists
American jazz alto saxophonists
Jazz fusion saxophonists
Jewish American musicians
University at Buffalo alumni
Jewish jazz musicians
21st-century American saxophonists
21st-century American male musicians
American male jazz musicians
Spyro Gyra members
21st-century American Jews